The 2015 Nigerian Senate election in Jigawa State was held on March 28, 2015, to elect members of the Nigerian Senate to represent Jigawa State. Abdullahi Abubakar Gumel representing Jigawa North West, Mohammed Sabo representing Jigawa South West and Muhammad Shitu representing Jigawa North East all won on the platform of All Progressives Congress.

Overview

Summary

Results

Jigawa North West 
All Progressives Congress candidate Abdullahi Abubakar Gumel won the election, defeating People's Democratic Party candidate Danladi Abdullahi Sankara and other party candidates.

Jigawa South West 
All Progressives Congress candidate Mohammed Sabo won the election, defeating People's Democratic Party candidate Abdulmumini Hassan and other party candidates.

Jigawa North East 
All Progressives Congress candidate Muhammad Shitu won the election, defeating People's Democratic Party candidate Adamu Ahmed and other party candidates.

References 

March 2015 events in Nigeria
Jigawa State Senate elections
Jig